Phaneroctena is a genus of moths in the family Cosmopterigidae.

Species
Phaneroctena homopsara Turner, 1923
Phaneroctena pentasticta Turner, 1923
Phaneroctena spodopasta Turner, 1923

References

External links
Natural History Museum Lepidoptera genus database

Cosmopteriginae